Results from the 1994 Monaco Grand Prix Formula Three held at Monte Carlo on May 14, 1994, in the Circuit de Monaco.

Classification 

Monaco Grand Prix Formula Three
Monaco Grand Prix Formula Three
Motorsport in Monaco